Rhipidia is a genus of crane fly in the family Limoniidae.

Species
Subgenus Eurhipidia (Alexander, 1965)
R. aoroneura (Alexander, 1956)
R. argema (Alexander, 1967)
R. brevifilosa (Alexander, 1965)
R. citricolor (Alexander, 1976)
R. coheriana (Alexander, 1959)
R. endecamera (Alexander, 1960)
R. expansimacula (Alexander, 1934)
R. extraria (Alexander, 1955)
R. formosana (Alexander, 1923)
R. garrula (Alexander, 1933)
R. garruloides (Alexander, 1933)
R. hariola (Alexander, 1965)
R. hexadiclona (Alexander, 1967)
R. impicta (Edwards, 1933)
R. incompleta (Riedel, 1914)
R. luteipleuralis (Alexander, 1931)
R. mediofilosa (Alexander, 1965)
R. morionella (Edwards, 1928)
R. perscitula (Alexander, 1966)
R. pictipennis (Edwards, 1926)
R. simplicis (Alexander, 1966)
R. submorionella (Alexander, 1956)
Subgenus Rhipidia (Meigen, 1818)
R. afra (Bergroth, 1888)
R. agglomerata (Alexander, 1926)
R. alampetis (Alexander, 1971)
R. annulicornis (Enderlein, 1912)
R. antennata (Brunetti, 1911)
R. antrotrichia (Alexander, 1967)
R. aoneurodes (Alexander, 1979)
R. aphrodite (Alexander, 1942)
R. aspilota (Alexander, 1967)
R. atomaria (Loew, 1866)
R. atopolobos (Alexander, 1979)
R. banosensis (Alexander, 1946)
R. bellingeri (Alexander, 1964)
R. bipectinata (Williston, 1896)
R. brevipetalia (Alexander, 1950)
R. breviramosa (Alexander, 1936)
R. bruchiana (Alexander, 1929)
R. bryanti (Johnson, 1909)
R. calverti (Alexander, 1912)
R. cassandra (Alexander, 1945)
R. cermatoleuca (Alexander, 1967)
R. chiloeana (Alexander, 1967)
R. choprai (Alexander, 1927)
R. commelina (Alexander, 1946)
R. complexa (Alexander, 1950)
R. conica conica (Alexander, 1914)
R. conica turrifera (Alexander, 1931)
R. costaloides (Alexander, 1920)
R. cramptoni (Alexander, 1912)
R. crassirostris (Alexander, 1965)
R. ctenophora (Loew, 1871)
R. curtiramosa (Alexander, 1979)
R. cymula (Alexander, 1979)
R. cytherea (Alexander, 1942)
R. degradans (Savchenko, 1983)
R. demarcata (Brunetti, 1912)
R. diacaena (Alexander, 1978)
R. dione (Alexander, 1964)
R. diploclada (Alexander, 1941)
R. discreta (Edwards, 1926)
R. distela (Alexander, 1967)
R. domestica (Osten Sacken, 1860)
R. dotalis (Alexander, 1942)
R. effusa (Alexander, 1956)
R. eliana (Alexander, 1950)
R. eremnocera (Alexander, 1970)
R. eremnoptera (Alexander, 1967)
R. euterpe (Alexander, 1961)
R. femorasetosa (Alexander, 1956)
R. fidelis (Osten Sacken, 1860)
R. flabelliformis (Alexander, 1934)
R. flavopostica (Alexander, 1978)
R. gaspicola (Alexander, 1941)
R. gethosyne (Alexander, 1961)
R. gracililoba (Alexander, 1978)
R. gracilirama (Alexander, 1940)
R. griseipennis (Edwards, 1926)
R. griveaudi (Alexander, 1961)
R. guerrerensis (Alexander, 1946)
R. hedys (Alexander, 1980)
R. hirtilobata (Alexander, 1939)
R. hoguei (Byers, 1981)
R. holwayi (Alexander, 1978)
R. huachucensis (Alexander, 1955)
R. hypomelania (Alexander, 1936)
R. illuminata (Alexander, 1967)
R. impictipennis (Alexander, 1952)
R. improperata (Alexander, 1936)
R. inaequipectinata (Alexander, 1929)
R. ingenua (Alexander, 1945)
R. invaripennis (Alexander, 1941)
R. isospilota (Alexander, 1936)
R. javanensis (de Meijere, 1911)
R. josephi (Alexander, 1971)
R. jubilata (Alexander, 1938)
R. juninensis (Alexander, 1942)
R. kama (Alexander, 1956)
R. katernes (Alexander, 1980)
R. laetitarsis (Alexander, 1938)
R. lais (Alexander, 1950)
R. latilutea (Alexander, 1942)
R. leda (Alexander, 1945)
R. lichnophora (Alexander, 1962)
R. longispina (Alexander, 1922)
R. longurio (Alexander, 1938)
R. lucea (Savchenko, 1974)
R. luquilloensis (Alexander, 1950)
R. luxuriosa (Alexander, 1929)
R. maculata (Meigen, 1818)
R. martinezi (Alexander, 1978)
R. megalopyga (Alexander, 1967)
R. melanaria (Alexander, 1942)
R. microsticta (Alexander, 1921)
R. miosema (Speiser, 1909)
R. monnula (Alexander, 1962)
R. monoctenia (Alexander, 1935)
R. monophora (Alexander, 1952)
R. monoxantha (Alexander, 1944)
R. mordax (Alexander, 1950)
R. multifida (Alexander, 1926)
R. multiguttata (Alexander, 1912)
R. multipunctigera (Alexander, 1946)
R. multiramosa (Alexander, 1950)
R. mutila (Alexander, 1928)
R. myriosticta (Alexander, 1941)
R. mystica (Alexander, 1931)
R. neglecta (Alexander, 1936)
R. neomelanaria (Alexander, 1980)
R. neomystica (Alexander, 1980)
R. neorhasma (Alexander, 1978)
R. nigrorostrata (Alexander, 1938)
R. nobilissima (Alexander, 1941)
R. nubilosa (Alexander, 1967)
R. ocellana (Alexander, 1942)
R. pallatangae (Alexander, 1929)
R. pallidipes (Alexander, 1921)
R. pallidistigma (Alexander, 1928)
R. paraguayana (Alexander, 1929)
R. parahedys (Alexander, 1980)
R. paulus (Alexander, 1947)
R. perarmata (Alexander, 1921)
R. peratripes (Alexander, 1967)
R. persimplex (Alexander, 1950)
R. phaon (Alexander, 1950)
R. platyphallus (Alexander, 1969)
R. plurinervis (Riedel, 1921)
R. polyclada (Alexander, 1943)
R. polythrix (Alexander, 1978)
R. praesuffusa (Alexander, 1969)
R. pratti (Alexander, 1950)
R. preapicalis (Alexander, 1956)
R. proctigerica (Alexander, 1950)
R. profana (Alexander, 1941)
R. proliferata (Alexander, 1940)
R. proseni (Alexander, 1955)
R. pulcherrima (Edwards, 1928)
R. pulchra (de Meijere, 1904)
R. pumilistyla (Alexander, 1978)
R. punctiplena (Mik, 1887)
R. punctoria (Alexander, 1929)
R. reductispina (Savchenko, 1983)
R. rhasma (Alexander, 1971)
R. schadei (Alexander, 1929)
R. schwarzi (Alexander, 1912)
R. sejugata (Alexander, 1939)
R. septentrionis (Alexander, 1913)
R. servilis (Alexander, 1932)
R. seydeli (Alexander, 1956)
R. shannoni (Alexander, 1914)
R. sigilla (Alexander, 1956)
R. sigilloides (Alexander, 1955)
R. simplicicornis (Alexander, 1938)
R. spadicithorax (Edwards, 1912)
R. sprucei (Alexander, 1943)
R. steyskali (Alexander, 1970)
R. stonei (Alexander, 1938)
R. subcostalis (Alexander, 1922)
R. subpectinata (Williston, 1896)
R. subproctigerica (Alexander, 1978)
R. subterminalis (Alexander, 1921)
R. subtesselata (Brunetti, 1912)
R. subvafra (Alexander, 1962)
R. succentiva (Alexander, 1941)
R. superarmata (Alexander, 1942)
R. surinamica (Alexander, 1946)
R. sybarita (Alexander, 1946)
R. sycophanta (Alexander, 1946)
R. synspilota (Alexander, 1935)
R. tabescens (Enderlein, 1912)
R. tenuirama (Alexander, 1966)
R. tetracantha (Alexander, 1927)
R. tetraleuca (Alexander, 1937)
R. thysbe (Alexander, 1942)
R. tiresias (Alexander, 1950)
R. triarmata (Alexander, 1930)
R. tridigitata (Alexander, 1943)
R. trigracilis (Alexander, 1958)
R. tripectinata (Alexander, 1931)
R. turritella (Alexander, 1943)
R. ugra (Alexander, 1965)
R. unipectinata (Williston, 1896)
R. uniseriata (Schiner, 1864)
R. uxor (Alexander, 1942)
R. vafra (Alexander, 1941)
R. variicosta (Alexander, 1934)
R. willistoniana (Alexander, 1929)
R. xanthoscelis (Edwards, 1933)

References

Limoniidae